Sean Cameron Casey (born December 28, 1967) is an American IMAX filmmaker and storm chaser who appeared in the Discovery Channel reality television series Storm Chasers. Casey created an IMAX film called Tornado Alley about chasing tornadoes and had to build the Tornado Intercept Vehicle (TIV) and the Tornado Intercept Vehicle 2 (TIV2) to film inside a tornado.
Tornado Alley was released worldwide on March 18, 2011. Casey has been named one of the 50 best minds of 2008 by Discover Magazine.

Tornado Intercept Vehicles

Casey built two mobile armored trucks called Tornado Intercept Vehicles (TIV and TIV2) to film very near to from inside the tornadoes he chases, sometimes with atmospheric scientist Joshua Wurman's Center for Severe Weather Research and the Doppler on Wheels radar trucks (DOW 2-DOW 7).

Construction began on the TIV in 2003 and cost over $80,000. Sean began concept of the TIV after having to use rented minivans to storm chase, and being unable to get up close to a tornado.
Construction began on TIV2 in September 2007 with help from Great Plains Technology Center in Lawton, Oklahoma after Sean realized he needed to upgrade his vehicle. It stands taller than the original TIV and is capable of going on mud and unpaved roads without the fear of getting stuck. The original TIV has 2-wheel drive and extremely low ground clearance that would cause it to get stuck on unpaved roads. It is powered by a 6.7-liter Cummins turbodiesel engine, modified with propane and water injection to produce 625 horsepower. The body of TIV2 is constructed of a 1/8-inch steel skin welded over a  square tubing steel frame. The windows in TIV2 are all bullet resistant 1 5/8 inch interlayered polycarbonate sheets and tempered glass. TIV2 also features an IMAX filming turret similar to the one on the original TIV. The original TIV's somewhat cumbersome hydraulic claws were not used on TIV2 in favor of four hydraulic skirts that drop down to deflect wind over the TIV to stabilize it and protect the underside from debris plus two stakes that extend down . The stakes were so effective that after the first use, TIV2 could not retract the stakes and they had to be dug out by hand.

Film and television work

IMAX films
Africa: The Serengeti (1994)
Alaska: Spirit of the Wild (1997)
Amazing Journeys (1999)
Forces of Nature (2004)
Tornado Alley (2011)
Extreme Weather (2016)
Back from the Brink (Fall 2019)

Television
Casey appeared in the following television programs:
Tornado Intercept (2005)
Storm Chasers – Season 1 (2007)
The Science of Storm Chasing (2007)
Storm Chasers – Season 2 (2008)
Storm Chasers – Season 3 (2009)
Storm Chasers – Season 4 (2010)
Storm Chasers – Season 5 (2011)
The Ellen DeGeneres Show (November 13, 2007)
Marines: Earning the Title (director)
US Army Rangers (director)
Entertainment Tonight
Paula Zahn on CNN
Good Morning America
Fox and Friends
Today on NBC
NPR
The Insider
MythBusters, Storm Chasing Myths (October 13, 2010)
Spanish TV Program: "Desafio Extremo"(Extreme Challenge)(February 20, 2011)
TMZ
CNN Mornings
CBS Early Show
Border Security: Canada's Front Line

Music videos
Casey directed music videos for the following artists:
Rilo Kiley
Violent Femmes

Amr Diab Wayyaah (With Him) From Album - Wayyaah - Released in Summer 2009

See also
Tornado records
VORTEX2

References

External links
 Tornado Alley IMAX Movie

 of Storm Chasers
Production website of Storm Chasers

1967 births
American documentary filmmakers
American film directors
American film producers
Storm chasers
Living people